The 185th Air Refueling Wing is a unit of the Iowa Air National Guard, stationed at Colonel Bud Day Field, Sioux City, Iowa. If activated to federal service, the Wing is gained by the United States Air Force Air Mobility Command.

Mission
The mission of the 185th Wing is to provide air refueling and mobility sustainment in support of the global mission of the Air Force. As a community-based organization the wing and its subordinate units are also tasked to support the state of Iowa in the event of a state emergency.

Units
The 185th Air Refueling Wing consists of the following major units:
 185th Operations Group
 174th Air Refueling Squadron
 185th Mission Support Group
 185th Maintenance Group
 185th Medical Group

History
The wing was first organized on 1 October 1962 as the 185th Tactical Fighter Group as a single headquarters for the 174th Tactical Fighter Squadron and its support units.  This reorganization nearly doubled the authorized personnel of the Air National Guard at Sioux City Municipal Airport to over 800 officers and airmen. This era would also mark the longest continuous period the group flew one model aircraft.  The 185th flew the North American F-100 Super Sabre from its establishment until 1977, a period of 15 years.

Vietnam era
On 26 January 1968, the 185th was called to active Federal service as a result of the Pueblo Crisis. During its active duty period, the group moved to Cannon Air Force Base, New Mexico, but became little more than a paper unit.  Its 174th Tactical Fighter Squadron, augmented by other personnel from the group, deployed with their F-100s to Phù Cát Air Base, South Vietnam on 11 May 1968 where it was assigned to the 37th Tactical Fighter Wing. During the course of the next 90 days, the balance of the 185th was deployed to six military bases in South Korea and others in the United States. During its year in South Vietnam, the 174th flew 6,539 combat sorties totaling 11,359 hours of combat time. The unit was awarded the Presidential Unit Citation and the Air Force Outstanding Unit Award. Individually, its members were awarded 12 Silver Stars, 35 Distinguished Flying Crosses, 30 Bronze Star Medals, 115 Air Force Commendation Medals, 325 Air Medals, and 1 Purple Heart.

While at Phù Cát, one pilot that flew one of the 174th's planes was Dick Rutan. Dick went on to become the first pilot to take a non-stop unrefuelled trip around the world. Dick was also one of the Misty FACs, a top-secret squadron that flew high-risk missions during their tours. Another member of this famous squadron was Medal of Honor recipient Colonel George "Bud" Day, for whom the airfield in Sioux City is named.

All personnel and aircraft were released from active duty in May 1969 and returned to Sioux City. Vietnam also spawned the nickname Bats. The "Bat" depicted on the tails of the aircraft and the shoulder patch of the pilots became a legendary symbol of the 185th when its 174th Tactical Fighter Squadron was called to duty in Vietnam. "Bat" was the call sign of the 174th.  The other symbol often associated with the squadron has been the Indian Chief that is part of the unit patch as well as part of the paint work on the aircraft.

A-7D Corsair IIs
In 1977, the 185th converted to the LTV A-7D Corsair II.  While flying the A-7Ds, the unit won the Spaatz Trophy for the second time in 1990, recognizing them as the best Air Guard unit in the country. The Unit also was awarded the Air Force Outstanding Unit award five times; in 1985, 1986, 1987, 1989 and in 1991. In addition, the 185th's Logistics Group was a two-time winner of the Daedalian Trophy which recognizes the best maintenance team in the Aior Guard. In 1989, the 185th won the Twelfth Air Force A-7 gunnery meet for the second time. Also in 1989, the 185th received the Gunsmoke A-7 Maintenance Team Award for its aircraft.

Modern era
On 19 December 1991, the group received General Dynamics F-16 Fighting Falcons. On 16 March 1992, the 185th Tactical Fighter Group was redesignated the 185th Fighter Group. One month later, the unit was rated operational with the Fighting Falcon. As the Air Force and Air Guard standardized unit structures under the Objective Wing concept, the 185th was designated the 185th Fighter Wing. The F-16 "Fighting Falcon" would be the last jet that the unit would fly before conversion to KC-135E tankers in 2003. The 185th continued to be an award-winning unit. In 1994, the unit gained the Winston P. Wilson Award as well as the Air Force Association Outstanding Air National Guard Unit Award. In 1999, Congress appropriated $6.5 million for the Air National Guard Aircraft Paint Facility located on base.

The wing was redesignated the 185th Air Refueling Wing. In November 2003, the first all Sioux City crew flew a Boeing KC-135 Stratotanker out of Sioux City. Within a year, the 185th was flying refueling missions from Geilenkirchen, Germany supporting Airborne Warning and Control System aircraft of the North Atlantic Treaty Organization.  In 2007, the 185th began transitioning from the KC-135E to the KC-135R model.

Today, the 185th consists of nearly 900 members that include traditional guardsman, full-time military, air technicians and state contract employees.

Operations and decorations
Spaatz Trophy (1990)
Presidential Unit Citation (1968)
Air Force Outstanding Unit Award (1968, 1985, 1986, 1987, 1989, 1991, 2008, and 2009)
185th Logistics Group-Daedalian Trophy (2-time winner)
Winston P. Wilson Award (1994)
Air Force Association Outstanding Air National Guard Unit Award (1994)

Lineage
 Established as the 185th Tactical Fighter Group on 11 September 1962
 Organized on 1 October 1962
 Ordered into active service on 26 January 1968
 Relieved from active duty and returned to the control of the state of Iowa on 28 May 1969
 Redesignated 185th Fighter Group on 16 March 1992
 Redesignated 185th Fighter Wing on 1 May 1992
 Redesignated 185th Air Refueling Wing on 1 November 2003

Assignments
 140th Tactical Fighter Wing, 1 October 1962
 832d Air Division, 26 January 1968
 140th Tactical Fighter Wing, 29 May 1969
 132d Tactical Fighter Wing 1 June 1969
 Iowa Air National Guard, 16 March 1992 – Present

 Mobilization gaining commands
 Tactical Air Command, 1 October 1962
 Air Combat Command, 1 June 1992
 Air Mobility Command, 1 November 2003 – present

Components
 185th Operations Group, 1 June 1992 – Present
 185th Logistics Group (later 185th Maintenance Group), 1 June 1992 – Present
 185th Support Group (later 185th Mission Group), 1 June 1992 – Present
 174th Tactical Fighter Squadron (later 174th Fighter Squadron, 174th Air Refueling Squadron), 1 October 1962 – 26 January 1968; 29 May 1969 – Present

Stations
 Sioux City Municipal Airport, 1 October 1962
 Cannon Air Force Base, 26 January 1968
 Sioux City Municipal Airport (Later Sioux City Air National Guard Base, also Colonel Bud Day Field), 29 May 1969 – present

Aircraft

 North American F-100C Super Sabre (1962–1977)
 LTV A-7D Corsair (1977–1991)
 General Dynamics F-16 Fighting Falcon (1992–2002)
 Boeing KC-135E Stratotanker (2002–2007)
 Boeing KC-135R Stratotanker (2007 – present)

Aircraft flying in this unit
KC-135

References

Notes

Citations

Bibliography

External links
 History and Lineage 185th Air Refueling
Celebration of the Iowa ANG's 60 years
 

Wings of the United States Air National Guard
Military units and formations in Iowa
0185